SHiiKANE is a British-Nigerian female group made of three sisters, Twins HRH Shay Ifeanyichukwu, Princess Annamay Uchechukwu and sister Baby-Kay Nkemdilim.

Biography
SHiiKANE originally from Asaba, Delta State, Nigeria; born and raised in London, UK. The band was formed in 2005 in London and their name derives from an amalgamation of their first names Shay, Kay and Annamay. SHiiKANE made their debut in 2009 with the release of their debut mixtape “SHiiKANE Touched This!" After the release of the mixtape, they released their debut single “Bamboo Dey Chop (Say Goodbye)”. SHiiKANE released their promotional album “Paradise On Saturn” in 2011. SHiiKANE teamed up with producer P2J in 2014 and released a track titled “SugaKANE” which was made “Song of the week” by Toolz of BeatFM 99.9 Lagos Nigeria. Their music is influenced by different musical genres including R&B, Rock, Hip Hop, Soul and Gospel.

In 2010, Shiikane did a UK school tour with acts such as Bashy. The band also became ambassadors for the HIV Charity Crusaid Terrance Higgins Trust and performed at the annual Race For Life event.

The group has previously won the “Best Music Video” award in 2015 for their single "Tuele" directed by Director Q and “Best UK African Female” 2016 at the BEFFTA Awards.

Discography

Albums

Singles

Awards & Nominations

Notable Performances
 Olic 3 (Olamide)
 D’banj & Tekno Miles UK Tour
 Olic 5 (Olamide)
 The 'City of David' concert (Davido Tour)
 GLW Fest 2018
 Kizz Daniel LIVE IN CONCERT (UK Tour) April 2019

References

Nigerian musical groups